Darren Jude Wates (born 2 July 1977) is a former Australian cricketer who played first-class and limited overs cricket for Western Australia.

Wates attended Aquinas College, Perth and the University of Western Australia. He started his career in the 1999–2000 season, in which he won the best new talent award on the way to the Western Warriors winning the Mercantile Mutual Cup Final.

In 2004, he gave away his career as a lawyer to become a full-time cricketer, but injuries have restricted his last few seasons, with persistent hamstring problems.

In the 2004 ING Cup Final, Wates starred with Kade Harvey to add 75 for the seventh wicket to guide the Western Warriors to their first title since 1999–2000. Wates hit the winning runs off the bowling of Clinton Perren in the final over of the match.

External links

1977 births
Australian cricketers
Living people
Western Australia cricketers
People educated at Aquinas College, Perth
University of Western Australia alumni
Cricketers from Perth, Western Australia
Sportsmen from Western Australia